Bart Verbruggen (born 18 August 2002) is a Dutch professional footballer who plays as a goalkeeper for Belgian First Division A club Anderlecht.

Club career
Verbruggen joined Anderlecht in 2020 from N.A.C. Breda. He made his professional debut on 2 May 2021, in a 2–2 Belgian First Division A draw against Club Brugge.

International career 
On 17 March 2023, Verbruggen received his first official call-up to the Dutch senior national team for the UEFA Euro 2024 qualifiers against France and Gibraltar.

References

External links
 

2002 births
Living people
Dutch footballers
Association football goalkeepers
NAC Breda players
R.S.C. Anderlecht players
RSCA Futures players
Belgian Pro League players
Challenger Pro League players
Netherlands youth international footballers
Dutch expatriate sportspeople in Belgium
Expatriate footballers in Belgium
Dutch expatriate footballers